Froggattisca rennerensis is a species of cave-dwelling antlion (or Myrmeleontidae), endemic to the Northern Territory. 

The species was first described by Miller and Stange in 2012, Its species epithet, rennerensis, names the species as comiing from  its type locality, Mount Renner, in the Northern Territory. 

Miller and Stange describe this species as not being a true cave-dwelling antlion, because  not all life stages are confined to caves.

Description
Froggattisca rennerensis may be differentiated from other Froggattisca species using the following characters: 
 adults with
 forewings without markings;
 foreleg longer than hindleg;
 minute tibial spurs;
 larvae whose
ventral head capsule has sparse tiny black setae;
ventral head capsule is unmarked;
ventral side of the abdomen and thorax have dark-brown markings;
mandible is the same length as the head capsule.

The insect is known only from its type locality, Mount Renner.

References

Myrmeleontidae
Insects described in 2012